Han Ye-ri (born Kim Ye-ri on December 23, 1984) is a South Korean actress.

Career
Han built her filmography by starring in short films and indies. She drew notice in the sports drama As One (2012), for which she learned the Hamgyŏng dialect in her role as real-life North Korean table tennis athlete Yu Sun-bok. She played her first mainstream leading roles in the action thrillers Commitment (2013) and Haemoo (2014), and romantic film A Dramatic Night (2015). Han also starred in the critically acclaimed indie Worst Woman (2016) by Kim Jong-kwan.

Han extended her filmography to television, starring in sageuk Six Flying Dragons (2015-2016) and youth comedy Hello, My Twenties! (2016-2017).

In 2021, Han's Hollywood debut, Minari, was nominated for six categories at the 93rd Academy Awards including Best Picture, Best Director, Music, Best Original Screenplay, Best Supporting Actress and Best Actor.

In April 2021, Han signed with USA agency Echo Lake Entertainment, and Han confirmed her attendance at the 2021 Academy Awards.

Personal life 
On June 9, 2022, the agency confirmed that Han married her non-celebrity boyfriend in early 2022.

Filmography

Film

Television series

Web series

Radio shows

Discography

Singles

Awards and nominations

State honors

Notes

References

External links 

 
 
 Han Ye-ri at Saram Entertainment 
 Han Ye-ri at Daum 
 
 
 

21st-century South Korean actresses
South Korean film actresses
South Korean stage actresses
South Korean television actresses
Korea National University of Arts alumni
1984 births
Living people
People from Jecheon
Best New Actress Paeksang Arts Award (film) winners